Krystyna Marie Freda (born 1 November 1993) is a footballer who plays as a forward. Born in the United States, she represents Cyprus internationally.

Early life
Freda was raised in the Somerset section of Franklin Township, Somerset County, New Jersey.

International goals

Personal life
Freda belongs to the LGBT community and she is an Athlete Ally pro ambassador.

References

External links
Krystyna Freda's website

1993 births
Living people
Sportspeople from Franklin Township, Somerset County, New Jersey
Soccer players from New Jersey
American women's soccer players
Women's association football forwards
Franklin High School (New Jersey) alumni
Winthrop Eagles women's soccer players
Merilappi United players
Glasgow City F.C. players
Kansallinen Liiga players
LGBT association football players
LGBT people from New Jersey
American LGBT sportspeople
American expatriate women's soccer players
American expatriate sportspeople in Finland
Expatriate women's footballers in Finland
American expatriate sportspeople in Scotland
Expatriate women's footballers in Scotland
American emigrants to Cyprus
Naturalized citizens of Cyprus
Cypriot women's footballers
Apollon Ladies F.C. players
Barcelona FA players
Cyprus women's international footballers
Cypriot people of American descent
Cypriot LGBT people
Hibernian W.F.C. players